Vasiliy Vasilyevich Buturlin (Died 1656) was a noble (boyar) Muscovite military leader and diplomat. He is better known for serving as a Muscovite envoy during negotiations with Bohdan Khmelnytskyi in Pereyaslav in 1654. Next year Buturlin successfully led Muscovite expeditionary forces against Stanisław "Rewera" Potocki and assisting Cossack army of Bohdan Khmelnytsky. In December of the same year Buturlin was recalled by the Muscovite government and died on the way back to Moscow.

External links
 Buturlin at the Encyclopedia of Ukraine
 Butulin at Hrono
 Buturlin at the Great Soviet Encyclopedia
 Buturlin at the Brockhaus and Efron Encyclopedic Dictionary

1656 deaths
Russian military leaders
Russian diplomats
Year of birth missing